The Crown of Tonga was made in 1873 for George Tupou I at the behest of his prime minister, The Reverend Shirley Waldemar Baker.  The crown was fashioned by the jewellery firm of Hardy Brothers of Sydney, Australia.  The gold crown of Tonga is reputedly the largest and heaviest crown in the world.

History
For some time, Tonga's independence had been threatened by France. Since 1862 the German Empire also posed a threat to Tonga's independence with threats of annexation. The King and Reverend Baker composed the Constitution of 1875, which is still in effect today. At this time, Tonga also adopted a national flag, a coat-of-arms and a national anthem.

The first king to be crowned with the historic crown was King George Tupou II, the great-grandson and successor Tupou. Tupou II was crowned on 17 March 1893. His daughter and successor Queen Sālote Tupou III was crowned on 11 October 1918. Queen Sālote was succeeded by her eldest son, who became King Tāufa'āhau Tupou IV. He was crowned on his 49th birthday, 4 July 1967. King Tāufa'āhau was succeeded by his eldest son, who became King George Tupou V. He was crowned on 1 August 2008.

Tupou V died in March 2012, and was succeeded by his youngest brother, who now reigns as King 'Aho'eitu Tupou VI. King Tupou VI donned the historic crown at his own coronation on 4 July 2015.

References 

Tonga
Tongan monarchy
1873 in Tonga